The Bangladesh cricket team toured Zimbabwe from 4 to 21 August 2011. The tour consisted of one Test match and five One Day Internationals (ODIs) played against the Zimbabwean national team and one first-class match played against a Zimbabwean representative team. The Test match was Zimbabwe's first since India toured Zimbabwe in 2005. Zimbabwe won the Test match by 130 runs and also won the one-day series 3–2.

Squads

Bangladesh announced its squad for the Test match and ODI series on 15 July 2011. Zimbabwe announced its squad for the Test match and ODI series on 1 August 2011:

Tour matches

Zimbabwe XI vs Bangladeshis (3-day match)

Test series

Only Test

ODI series

1st ODI

2nd ODI

3rd ODI

4th ODI

5th ODI

References

2011 in Bangladeshi cricket
2011 in Zimbabwean cricket
2011
International cricket competitions in 2011